Hooktown is an unincorporated community in Nicholas County, Kentucky, United States.  It lies along the concurrent Routes 32 and 36 northwest of Nicholas County.  Its elevation is 794 feet (242 m).

References

Unincorporated communities in Nicholas County, Kentucky
Unincorporated communities in Kentucky